The RIT Tigers Women's' Hockey Team represented  the Rochester Institute of Technology in College Hockey America during the 2019-20 NCAA Division I women's ice hockey season.
While Chad Davis still shaped his team in his second year, he was able to gain stability with a large influx of underclassmen.

Offseason

April 3: RIT Athletic Hall of Famer and Hockey Humanitarian Award laureate Kristine (Pierce) Brassie ('99) died. Brassie was named in SPORTMagazine's Heroes Edition (November, 1998) along with football great John Elway, basketball legend Michael Jordan, and Wayne Gretzky of the NHL. She was the first RIT athlete to have her jersey (No. 12) retired.

Recruiting

Standings

2018–19 Tigers

2019–20 Schedule

|-
!colspan=12 style=| Regular Season

|-
!colspan=12 style=| CHA Tournament

Awards and honors

Senior goaltender Terra Lanteigne was named the CHA All-Conference Second Team on the strength of a 2.97 Goals Against Average. Lanteigne leaves RIT with 2,392 saves, the most in the program's history. She had been the 2019-19 CHA Player of the Year.

Freshman Forward Jaymee Nolan was named to the CHA All-Rookie Team, with six goals on the season.

References

RIT
RIT Tigers women's ice hockey seasons
Sports in Rochester, New York